Progress M1-3, identified by NASA as Progress 1P, was the first Progress spacecraft to visit the International Space Station. It was a Progress-M1 11F615A55 spacecraft, with the serial number 251.

Launch
Progress M1-3 was launched by a Soyuz-U carrier rocket from Site 1/5 at the Baikonur Cosmodrome. Launch occurred at 16:26:42 UTC on 6 August 2000. The spacecraft docked with the aft port of the Zvezda module at 20:12:56 UTC on 8 August.

Undocking
It remained docked for 75 days before undocking at 04:04:49 UTC on 1 November to make way for Soyuz TM-31. It was deorbited at 07:05:00 UTC on the same day. The spacecraft burned up in the atmosphere over the Pacific Ocean, with any remaining debris landing in the ocean at around 07:53:20 UTC.

Progress M1-3 carried supplies to the International Space Station. It was unloaded during the Space Shuttle missions STS-106 and STS-92, as the ISS did not yet have a permanent crew. The Expedition 1 crew arrived the day after Progress M1-3 departed the Station, using the docking port that it had vacated.

See also

 List of Progress flights
 Uncrewed spaceflights to the International Space Station

References

Progress (spacecraft) missions
Supply vehicles for the International Space Station
Spacecraft launched in 2000
Spacecraft which reentered in 2000
Spacecraft launched by Soyuz-U rockets